Shirabad (also Romanized as Shīrābād) is a village in Fenderesk-e Jonubi Rural District, Fenderesk District, Ramian County, Golestan Province of northern Iran.

It is located in the Alborz (Elburz) mountain range.

At the 2006 census, its population was 893, in 230 families.

The Shir-Abad Waterfall is in the village.

References 

Populated places in Ramian County
Settled areas of Elburz